East Linton is a village and former police burgh in East Lothian, Scotland, situated on the River Tyne and A199 road (former A1 road) five miles east of Haddington, with an estimated population of  in .
During the 19th century the population increased from 715 inhabitants in 1831 to 1,042 by 1881. The 1961 census showed the village had a population of 1,579. The number dropped significantly at the end of the 20th century, but has subsequently risen again.

Prehistory and archaeology 
Archaeological excavations in advance of a residential development by CFA Archaeology uncovered a Bronze Age barrow cemetery consisting of three ring-ditches. Cremation burials were recovered from all the ring-ditches, radiocarbon dated to between 1400-1000 BC. A large pit close to one of the ring-ditches, was likely used to dispose of the residue ash from funeral pyres, was also excavated. They also found a ditch dated to the medieval period.

History

Originally called "Linton", the village probably gets its name from the Linn (a waterfall) on the river which it grew alongside. It was later renamed "East Linton" to distinguish it from West Linton in Peebleshire when the railways were built.

Significant to the development of the village was the East Linton Bridge crossing the River Tyne, carrying the Edinburgh to Berwick-upon-Tweed post road (Great North Road).

In September 1549 French troops destroyed the bridge to delay the retreat of the English army.
The current bridge was built no later than 1560 at the same location.

Today, only one church remains active, Prestonkirk Parish Church which is also an old name of the parish. The village is now, along with Stenton and Whittingehame; part of the parish of Traprain. The original church was founded by Baldred of Tyninghame, also known as 'St Baldred of the Bass', in the sixth century. The current church tower dates from 1631, while the main building is from 1770. It was enlarged in 1824 and the interior was redesigned in 1892. The St Baldred window was established in 1959. There is also a Free Church of Scotland (St Andrew's) built in 1843, which had its own school, a Roman Catholic church (St Kentigern ) and a Methodist hall. Presbyterian Dissenters also used to worship in East Linton.
The clock on St Andrew's former church was put in by the village to commemorate Queen Victoria's Golden Jubilee; it was named "Jessie" after a local girl when some village lads climbed into the steeple and poured a libation over the clock to christen it. The name has remained ever since. There has long been a school in the village, and the mid-Victorian schoolmaster in East Linton was a George Pringle Smith (d.1850).

The fountain, which stands in The Square on the site of an old well, takes the form of a large cast iron basin with scalloped edges which stands on an ashlar pedestal and, in turn, supports a three-armed lamp standard.
At the base of this there are four young child figures beneath a scalloped canopy, each holding a vase out of which water flows.
A plaque attached to the N side of the pedestal records that the fountain was 'Presented to the Burgh of East Linton by John Drysdale Esq., Buenos Ayres. -1882-'
Around the bottom edge of the plaque is the legend 'John Storie Esq., Chief Magistrate.'
John Drysdale, was a former East Linton native who settled in Buenos Aires, to become a farmer/rancher/businessman.

Preston Mill, an old watermill, is on the outskirts. There has been a mill on the site since 1599, and it is still working. Attached to the watermill is a kiln, with a cowl of local design. The property is now in the care of the National Trust for Scotland.  The mill was the location setting for a number of scenes during the Jacobite Uprising in Season 1 of the 'Outlander' TV series.

Prestonkirk House dominates the entrance to Stories Park.  Built in 1865 as the county's Combination Poorhouse, it served 15 parishes and housed 88 people.  It now serves as housing and for the library and Day Centre.  Stories Park takes its name from the Storie family of veterinary surgeons, who lived in The Square and kept racehorses in their 'park'.  Francis Storie (d.1875) was East Linton's chief magistrate 1866–72.

The Peerie Well, beside the River Tyne, supplied the village with water from 1881.

Following the closure of the branch railway line to Haddington in 1949, the fine Victorian station on the East Coast Main Line at  became the next closest for that burgh. Though main line trains still thunder through at high speed, East Linton railway station was closed in 1964 and is now used as a residence. Following a local campaign for more than two decades, construction of a new two platform station on the East Coast Main Line to the west of the original village station site got underway in February 2022.
The £15m project will include pedestrian and cyclist access with lifts and a new foot bridge connecting both platforms.
There will be parking for 128 vehicles including 18 electric vehicle charging spaces.
The project is scheduled to be completed in March 2024.
Prior to the coming of the North British Railway, the mail coaches changed horses at the Douglas Inn, opposite the distillery in East Linton.

A surviving relic of East Linton's past importance as an agricultural centre is a timber octagonal auction mart for cattle, pigs and sheep in Station Road.
Dating back to 1850, the mart has recently been fully restored and is now used for various community functions and a Sunday market.  The location was used as the setting to re-introduce Stephen Bonnet in a darkly memorable fashion during Season 5 of the 'Outlander' TV series.

Notable people
 Robert Brown (1757-1831) agriculturalist was born here.
 Gavin Douglas (c.1474 - September 1522)
 William Dudgeon c.1753-1813) poet was born at Tyninghame and is buried at Prestonkirk.
 Charles Martin Hardie RSA (1858-1916) artist born here
 Andrew Meikle (1719-1811) mechanical engineer, credited with inventing the mechanical threshing machine died here.
 Robert Noble RSA (1857-1917) artist and founder and president of the Scottish Society of Arts lived his later years here and died here.
 John Pettie RSA (1839-1893) painter lived here.
 George Rennie (1802-1860) sculptor and politician was born here, at Phantassie.
 George Rennie  (1749-1828) agriculturalist, was born here at Phantassie.
 John Rennie (1761-1821) civil engineer was born here, at Phantassie.
 Gilbert Rule (1629-1701) prisoner on the Bass Rock and Principal of Edinburgh University
 John Shirreff (1759-1818) agricultural writer is buried at Prestonkirk.

Climate
Like most of Scotland, East Linton has a temperate, maritime climate which is relatively mild despite its northerly latitude. Winter daytime temperatures rarely fall below . and is milder than places such as Moscow and Labrador which lie at similar latitudes. Summer temperatures are normally moderate, rarely exceeding .
The prevailing wind direction is from the south west, which is often associated with warm, unstable air from the North Atlantic Current that can give rise to rainfall – although considerably less than locations in the west of Scotland. Rainfall is distributed fairly evenly throughout the year. Winds from an easterly direction are usually drier but considerably colder, and may be accompanied by haar, a persistent coastal fog.

Public transport

There are regular bus services linking the village with Edinburgh via Haddington, Dunbar continuing south to Berwick-upon-Tweed and North Berwick. The village was served by a railway station on the East Coast Main Line, which closed in 1964 as part of Dr Richard Beeching's Reshaping of British Railways.
A new £15m station is currently being built to the north of the existing station site and is scheduled to be opened in March 2024.

Sport 
East Linton has a local football team named East Linton AFC.

East Linton Curling Club was formed in 1837.

East Linton Bowling Club is situated in Bank Road.

Gaming 
East Linton is home to some of the offices of 4J Studios, most often known for developing Minecraft Console Edition.

See also
List of listed buildings in East Linton, East Lothian

References

External links

The East Linton Community Website has more information East Linton and area - home page - website, find history castles coast and countryside

The East Linton Community Hall Website has information on activities at the Hall East Linton Community Hall

The John Gray Centre has more information on the history of East Linton East Linton

Gazetteer for Scotland - Overview of East Linton East Linton from The Gazetteer for Scotland

 
Villages in East Lothian